Moses Godia Shipi (born March 2, 1979) is a Nigerian businessman and politician. He served as Personal Assistant to the former Governor of Bauchi state, Alh. (Dr). Malam Isa Yuguda. He got elected to serve as the National Chairman of All Blended Party (ABP) and former Presidential candidate among the 79 candidate that contested to be President of Nigeria in the 2019 Nigerian general election.

Early life 
Moses Godia Shipi was born on March 2, 1979, in Boi village, Bogoro Local Government Area of Bauchi State, Nigeria. His father is Moses Dawaki Shipi. His early childhood education came at Boi Central Primary School, Bogoro LGA, Bauchi State and Gonerit Memorial College Tuwan Kabwir, Kanke LGA of Plateau State. He has a bachelor's degree in Quantity Surveying from Abubakar Tafawa Balewa University.

Career
Moses was a member of People's Democratic Party (Nigeria) (PDP). From 2007 to 2010 he served as personal Assistant to Alh. (Dr). Malam Isa Yuguda before the 2017 formation of All Blended Party (ABP). At age 40 he was elected the National chairman of ABP which made him the youngest among 91 Approved Political Party national chairman in Nigeria. He was a presidential candidate of All blended Party.

He is the Chief Executive Officer (CEO) of La Shipson Construction Nigeria Limited, La Shipson Oil & Gas Nigeria Limited and La Shipson Shipping Company Nigeria Limited,la Shipson Hotel & Suits, la Shipson Travels and Tours, Moses Godia Shipi Foundation.

Personal life
He is married to Angela Bulus Godia Shipi and they have two children, Queenkyra Moses shipi and King-Kendrick Moses shipi.

References

Living people
1979 births
Nigerian businesspeople
Nigerian politicians
Abubakar Tafawa Balewa University alumni